Pont-Trambouze is a former commune in the Rhône department in eastern France.

History
On 1 January 2016, Cours-la-Ville, Pont-Trambouze and Thel merged becoming one commune called Cours.

See also
Communes of the Rhône department

References

Former communes of Rhône (department)
Beaujolais (province)